Andrew Garrad (born 8 November 1953 in Braunston, England) is an engineer and businessman and one of the pioneers of the modern wind energy industry. In 1984 he co-founded the consulting company Garrad Hassan ("GH") which supported the industry through design consultancy, testing, measurements, energy evaluation and technical due diligence. Software and services provided by GH became widely used.

Early life
From his school days he has had a strong interest in mathematics. He has a BA in Engineering Science from the University of Oxford and a PhD in theoretical fluid mechanics from the University of Exeter where he studied the boundary-layer flow over dolphins. 
He built his first wind turbine in 1971 which he erected at his parents' home. His enthusiasm for wind energy was sparked by a lecture by Ernst Schumacher in Oxford, also in 1971.

Career
He has been professionally involved in wind energy since 1979, when he joined the Wind Energy Group. Mathematical modelling remained his main enthusiasm and Garrad Hassan was built on the provision of mathematical models of all aspects of wind energy. His mission for the company was to be able to predict everything from the weather, through the turbines and wind farms to the electricity in the grid and finally the cash flow. In 1984 he wrote the initial version of the wind turbine system aeroelastic code Bladed whose development continues to this day. Data, both measured and predicted, were the main currency of Garrad Hassan and the company produced many other computational tools adopted by the industry. He was heavily involved in the technical due diligence of very large wind farms as part of the  project finance process common to big capital projects. GH, together with the offshore consultancy Tecnomare, undertook the first ever floating offshore wind turbine design studies. Although GH specialised in wind energy it also provided parallel services in wave and tidal energy, for example its WaveDyn software for predicting the dynamic behaviour of wave energy devices.

He was one of the pioneers of Chinese wind energy development and was co-Chair, with the Chinese Minister of Electric Power, of the first Chinese International Wind Energy Conference in Beijing in 1995 when there were no turbines in China! Later on, starting at the turn of the century, GH helped shape the newly formed Chinese industry with many design contracts and also strategic advice on the development of their nascent offshore industry.

He is a past-Chairman of the British Wind Energy Association, now Renewable UK. He was President of European Wind Energy Association (EWEA, now Wind Europe) from 2013 to 2014. He chaired Bristol's year as European Green Capital in 2015.

He sold Garrad Hassan to Germanischer Lloyd in 2009 and became President of the combined company, GL Garrad Hassan,  and hence was responsible for both consultancy and certification. When he retired in 2015 the renewable energy company had 1,000 staff in 29 countries. 
In retirement he remains active in wind energy and, in 2019, he was appointed Royal Academy of Engineering Visiting Professor in Renewable Energy by the University of Bristol. His job is to introduce students to the engineering world outside university.

Awards and prizes
He was awarded the honorary degree of Doctor of Engineering by the University of Bristol in 2009 and by the University of Exeter in 2018. He was a member of the Council (Governing Body) of the University of Bristol from 2012 to 2016 and is on the advisory board of the Cabot Institute. He is a Fellow of the Institution of Mechanical Engineers and the Royal Academy of Engineering and an Honorary Fellow of New College, Oxford. He received a CBE for services to renewable energy in the 2017 new year's honours list.

He has regularly been voted amongst “the most influential people in the wind energy business.” On his retirement the industry magazine, Wind Power Monthly, referred to him as “the godfather of wind energy technology.” OGM named him one of the world's seven most influential energy leaders along with Elon Musk and Bill Gates; Daily Magazine made a similar reference.

In 2006, he received the EWEA's Poul la Cour prize and in 2015 the Aeolus prize from the Hellenic Wind Energy Association the only “non-Greek” ever to do so.

Private life
He lives in Bristol, England and is married with four children.

References

1953 births
Living people
Wind power
Renewable energy
Alumni of the University of Oxford
20th-century British engineers
21st-century British engineers
Alumni of the University of Exeter